William Horace Taylor,  (28 October 1908 – 16 January 1999) was an officer in the Royal Naval Volunteer Reserve who was awarded the George Cross for the gallantry he displayed in bomb disposal work in September and October 1940 during the Second World War.

George Cross
Taylor was a probationary temporary sub-lieutenant defusing unexploded enemy bombs in September and October 1940. In particular, he defused a bomb at an RAF depot in Uxbridge.

Notice of his award appeared in the London Gazette on 14 January 1941, reading:

References

Military personnel from Manchester
British recipients of the George Cross
Royal Navy recipients of the George Cross
Members of the Order of the British Empire
Royal Naval Volunteer Reserve personnel of World War II
Bomb disposal personnel
Recipients of the Queen's Commendation for Brave Conduct

1908 births
1999 deaths